"Lovely" is a song written and recorded by American musical duo Twenty One Pilots. 

It was written for their second album, Regional at Best, and was later re-recorded as a bonus track for their third album, Vessel.

Releases
It was originally featured on their self-released album Regional at Best, but was re-recorded for Vessel and included as a Japanese bonus track for the album. "Lovely" was released as a promotional single for the band's trip to Japan, being released on Warner Japan on April 17. The song peaked at number 67 on the Japan Hot 100 chart.

Usage in media
"Lovely" appeared in a Japanese television advertisement called "Right-on" shortly before its release.

Track listing

Charts

Release history

Notes

References

2013 singles
Twenty One Pilots songs
2011 songs
Fueled by Ramen singles
Songs written by Tyler Joseph
Song recordings produced by Greg Wells